Aaron Young may refer to:

 Aaron Young (artist), artist based in New York
 Aaron Young (footballer) (born 1992), Australian rules football player
Aaron Young (curler) from 2013 Molson Canadian Men's Provincial Curling Championship

See also